Pinizzotto is an Italian surname. Notable people with the surname include:

Leonardo Pinizzotto (born 1986), Italian cyclist
Peter Pinizzotto, Italian-born Canadian soccer coach
Steve Pinizzotto (born 1984), Canadian-German ice hockey player

Italian-language surnames